Royal Prussian Jagdstaffel 82, commonly abbreviated to Jasta 82, was a "hunting group" (i.e., fighter squadron) of the Luftstreitkräfte, the air arm of the Imperial German Army during World War I. The squadron's predecessor, Kampfeinsitzerstaffel 2, would score six or more confirmed aerial victories.

History
Jasta 82 was one of the new squadrons authorized on 28 October 1918. Founded in early November 1918, less than a fortnight before the Armistice, it was based on Kampfeinsitzerstaffel 2[ ("Scout Detachment") 2.]

References

Bibliography
 

82
Military units and formations established in 1918
1918 establishments in Germany
Military units and formations disestablished in 1918